Erbessa stroudi is a moth of the family Notodontidae first described by James S. Miller in 2008. It is found on the slopes of the Cordillera Central in northern Costa Rica.

The length of the forewings is 16–18.5 mm for males and 16.5–18.5 mm for females.

The larvae feed on Eugenia valerii.

References

Moths described in 2008
Notodontidae